The following table presents a listing of Nigerian states' nicknames.

See also

 Lists of nicknames – nickname list articles on Wikipedia

References 

Nicknames
Lists of regional nicknames
Names of places in Africa